Varsity Hockey is a South African university field hockey competition. It is one of seven sports in the Varsity Sports series. The annual tournament involves the top hockey playing universities in the country, which belong to the University Sports Company. The tournament is run by Varsity Sports South Africa, and is endorsed by the South African Hockey Association and University Sport South Africa.

Participating Teams

As of 2014, 8 different teams have competed in the Varsity Hockey tournament:

Results

Men

Women

Performances by university

Men

Women

See also
InterVarsity Hockey

References

External links
 Official Website

Field hockey competitions in South Africa
Hockey
Hockey